Rabac is a Croatian resort town on Kvarner Bay, just southeast of Labin, in Istria.

Long a small fishing port, Rabac has grown in the 1970s into a resort town with numerous villas and apartment buildings.

The Rabac Festival is an annual electronic music festival that has been held there for many years; 3000 people attended in 2002.

History

Up until the end of the 19th century, Rabac was a small fishing village. British explorer Richard Francis Burton visited the village in 1876 and mentioned it his book The Seaboard of Istria. The first summer mansion was built at that time by the Prohaska family but got later destroyed during World War II. The first hotel in Rabac, named Quarnaro, was opened on 11 June 1889.

Hotels
Three  major hotels and a camping site are situated on the first beach. Along the 'Riva' apartments are available for rent. Along the second beach and Girandella countless hotels are situated, of particular note, the locally famous Albona hotel.

Tourist activity
Regular music concerts are held at Rabac beach and in the hotels. Magic shows at night are prevalent as are comedians. Tourist expeditions to Venice, Dubrovnik and Krka are common and operate daily at 1 and 3 pm. Fishing tours are also common and cost about 100 kuna.

Education
Although Rabac is better known as a travel and tourism destination, the Matija Vlačić Primary School offers four grades of primary education for the local students. For the higher grades and secondary education students have to travel to the nearby city of Labin.

Climate

Notable people
 Franka Batelić, musician, grew up in Rabac.
 Elis Lovrić, musician, grew up in Rabac.

References

External links

 

Populated places in Istria County